Ernesto Fajardo is a Colombian business executive, who is the current CEO of Alpina.

Early life 
Fajardo was born in Bogota, Colombia where he attended Colegio Nueva Granada. He received a bachelor's degree in business administration from the Universidad del Rosario, and an M.B.A. from Washington University in St. Louis.

Career 
Fajardo worked for the Monsanto Company between 1999 and 2009 during which he took on several different positions. From September 1999 to July 2004 he served as General Manager for the Andean Region and Latin America, and was subsequently elected Vice-President where he served until August 2009. After retiring from his role as Monsanto's Vice-President, he served as President of Inversiones Mundial S.A. from September 2009 to December 2012. Currently, Fajardo is serving as the CEO of the Alpina Company.

References 

Colombian chief executives
Del Rosario University alumni
Olin Business School (Washington University) alumni
Living people
Year of birth missing (living people)